The 2009–10 Segunda División season (known as the Liga Adelante for sponsorship reasons) was the 79th since its establishment. The first matches of the season were played on 29 August 2009, and the season ended on 19 June 2010. Real Betis, Numancia and Recreativo de Huelva are the teams which were relegated from La Liga the previous season. The teams which were promoted from Segunda División B were: Cádiz (champion), Cartagena (runner-up), Real Unión (play-off winner) and Villarreal B (play-off winner).

The first goal of the season was scored by Quique de Lucas, who scored a seventh-minute goal for Cartagena against Girona in the early kick-off. The first red card of the season was given to David González from Las Palmas in their opening game against Real Sociedad. The first hat-trick was scored by Cristhian Stuani in the match between Castellón and Albacete.

Teams 

The 2009–10 Segunda División was made up of the following teams:

League table

Results

Pichichi Trophy for top goalscorers 
Last updated 19 June 2010

Zamora Trophy for top goalkeepers 
Last updated 19 June 2010

Season statistics

Scoring 
 First goal of the season: Quique de Lucas for Cartagena against Girona (29 August 2009)
 Fastest goal in a match: 46 seconds – Carlos Carmona for Recreativo against Girona (2 January 2010)
 Goal scored at the latest point in a match: 90+4 minutes 
 Coke for Rayo Vallecano against Hércules (17 January 2010) 
 Rafa Jordá for Levante against Villarreal B (30 January 2010) 
 Kiko Ratón for Girona against Real Murcia (19 June 2010) 
 Widest winning margin: 5 
 Levante 6–1 Gimnàstic (13 March 2010)
 Most goals in a match: 8 
 Castellón 3–5 Albacete (12 September 2009)
 Rayo Vallecano 4–4 Hércules (17 January 2010)
 Cartagena 3–5 Levante (22 May 2010)
 First hat-trick of the season: Cristhian Stuani for Albacete against Castellón (12 September 2009)
 First own goal of the season: Dani Tortolero for Real Unión against Girona (26 September 2009)
 Most goals by one player in a single match: 4 – Jorge Molina for Elche against Real Sociedad (19 June 2010)
 Most goals by one team in a match: 6 
 Levante 6–1 Gimnàstic (13 March 2010)
 Most goals in one half by one team: 4
 Hércules 5–1 Real Sociedad (1 November 2009)
 Girona 4–0 Cádiz (21 November 2009)
 Elche 2–5 Las Palmas (3 January 2010)
 Rayo Vallecano 4–4 Hércules (17 January 2010)
 Salamanca 2–4 Villarreal B (23 January 2010) 
 Levante 6–1 Gimnàstic (13 March 2010)
 Elche 4–0 Girona (22 May 2010)
 Cartagena 3–5 Levante (22 May 2010)
 Real Unión 4–3 Numancia (22 May 2010)
 Hércules 5–1 Albacete (30 May 2010)
 Cartagena 0–4 Albacete (19 June 2010)
 Most goals scored by losing team: 3
 Castellón 3–5 Albacete (12 September 2009)
 Cartagena 3–4 Salamanca (12 December 2009)
 Cádiz 4–3 Albacete (7 March 2010)
 Cartagena 3–5 Levante (22 May 2010)
 Real Unión 4–3 Numancia (22 May 2010)

Cards 
 First yellow card: Roberto Trashorras for Celta against Numancia (29 August 2009)
 First red card: David González for Las Palmas against Real Sociedad (29 August 2009)

Teams by autonomous community 

Segunda División seasons
2009–10 in Spanish football leagues
Spain